The Beach Ballroom is an art deco building on the beach boulevard of Aberdeen, Scotland.  It is home to one of Scotland's finest dance floors – famous for its bounce – which floats on fixed steel springs. It was built in 1926, and is a Category B listed building.

It regularly plays host to music and dance events, conferences, weddings and British Masters Boxing bouts.

Famous acts to appear at the Beach Ballroom include The Beatles, The Small Faces, Pink Floyd, The Who, Cream, Joe Loss, Ken Mackintosh and more recently The Ordinary Boys. It is made from granite.

The Beach Ballroom is owned and operated by Aberdeen City Council. The Beach Ballroom is also the site of a webcam that faces South, along the beach towards Footdee. The Ballroom is connected to the more modern Beach Leisure Centre via an indoor walkway.

The main dance hall is octagonal and originally had a domed ceiling, though this has since been covered over with a suspended ceiling. The smaller Star Ballroom extension was opened in June 1963.

The Ballroom underwent a refurbishment from 2008 to April 2010.

References

Category B listed buildings in Aberdeen
Tourist attractions in Aberdeen
Music venues in Aberdeen
Art Deco architecture in Scotland
Ballrooms in the United Kingdom
1926 establishments in Scotland